Cover Up is an album of cover songs by Ministry (titled: Ministry and Co-Conspirators) released on April 1, 2008. The album includes previously released covers "Roadhouse Blues", "Lay Lady Lay" and "Supernaut". Cover Up was intended to be Ministry's final release before their three-year break up from 2008 to 2011.

On December 3, 2008, "Under My Thumb" was nominated for a Grammy Award in the category of Best Metal Performance in 2009. It lost to "My Apocalypse" by Metallica.

Track listing

Personnel 
 Alien Jourgensen – string arrangements (1, 11, 23, 44), horn arrangements (1–3), pedal steel guitar (1, 10), background vocals (1, 3, 4), lead guitar (2), B3 organ (3–5), keyboards (4), vocals (5, 7–11, 23, 44), programming (6, 8, 9), guitars (6, 8–10), slide guitar (7), harmonica (8), bass (9), harpsichord (11, 23, 44), drum programming, additional programming, production
 Sin Quirin – lead guitar (1, 5, 8), guitars (1–7, 11, 23, 44), bass (2–7, 11, 23, 44)
 Burton C. Bell – vocals (1)
 Tony Campos – bass (1)
 Josh Bradford – vocals (2, 3)
 Clayton Worbeck – keyboards (2)
 Thomas M. Victor – vocals (4, 6), lead guitar (4, 6), guitar (8)
 Hell Paso Mosh Choir – background vocals (5)
 Paul Raven – bass (8)
 Casey Chaos – intro vocals (8)
 John S. Bilberry – drum programming (8), additional programming, engineering
 Paul Barker –  bass (10)
 Jeff Ward – drums (9)
 Mike Scaccia – guitar (9)
 Rey Washam – drums (10)
 Louis Svitek – guitar (10)
 Edu Mussi – piano (11, 23)
 Alejandro Rosso – background vocals (11, 23, 44)
 Juan José González – background vocals (11, 23, 44)
 Samuel D'Ambruoso III – drum programming
 Dave Donnely – mastering
 Lawton Outlaw – art direction, design, layout

References 

2008 albums
Albums produced by Al Jourgensen
Covers albums
Ministry (band) albums